Ōpoho is a suburb of the New Zealand city of Dunedin. It sits on the western flank of Signal Hill, New Zealand,  to the northeast of the city centre, overlooking North East Valley and the Dunedin Botanic Gardens.

Ōpoho is one of Dunedin's more prestigious residential suburbs however still has somewhat mixed demographics, containing student flats, significant numbers of elderly citizens, and the houses of many in the academic community. There was a former retail area in the southern part of Signal Hill Road, but this has long gone and the area is now largely occupied by student flats. Above the suburb sits the Centennial Lookout, a memorial built on the top of Signal Hill to mark the centenary of New Zealand in 1940. Impressive views over the city can be gained from here.

Ōpoho takes its name from the small stream, Ōpoho Creek (also known as Stony Creek). This stream runs south along the western flank of Signal Hill, past Logan Park High School in Dunedin North, before being diverted through culverts and flowing into the Water of Leith close to it outflow into the Otago Harbour. Ōpoho is a Māori word, simply meaning "The place of Poho", Poho being an 18th-century Ngati Wairua chief who lived close to the stream's outflow, which at that time was into Pelichet Bay (the bay has since been reclaimed and is now part of Logan Park).

Ōpoho's is largely concentrated around two long streets, Evans Street and Signal Hill Road, which run across the flanks of Signal Hill. Signal Hill Road continues to wind to the Centennial memorial close to the hill's summit. Several steep streets connect these two streets or descend to North East Valley. Chief among these are Blacks Road and Ōpoho Road, the latter of which is the main route to and from the suburb. It runs along the northern edge of Dunedin Botanic Gardens and connects with Dunedin's main arterial streets at the Gardens Corner. A further street, Lovelock Avenue (named for Dunedin Olympic gold medallist Jack Lovelock), winds through the upper reaches of the Botanic Gardens, emerging close to the University of Otago in Dunedin North.

The first European settlers in the area were farmers, and the suburb remained semi-rural until the 1940s. There are still some farms close to the top of Signal Hill Road, though much of the top of Signal Hill is now a scenic reserve, Burns Park. Early farmers in the area included John Switzer, John Broome, and John Black. The area was at first administered by the Signal Hill Roads Board, which became part of the new North East Valley municipality in 1877. This amalgamated with the city of Dunedin in 1910.

As with many parts of Dunedin, Ōpoho was initially composed of many smaller named townships, the names of some of which are still used by local residents. In 1873, the first residential subdivision of Ōpoho began with Ōpoho Township (the area south of Blacks Road), followed soon after by Maybank Township immediately to the north and, later, by Grandview Township, to the north of Maybank (the names of Maybank and Grandview survive in two of Ōpoho's streets). By the 1890s, most of the subdivisions of Ōpoho Township were occupied and Maybank was growing. Grandview was developed during the 1920s. Other township names occasionally encountered include St James' Park, a small area including Grey Street and James Streets on the lower slopes between Ōpoho and North East Valley.

The suburb of Ōpoho has numerous prominent landmarks, most prominently the Dunedin Botanic Garden and Centennial Monument (see Signal Hill, New Zealand). Other landmarks of note include the Northern Cemetery, which occupies a low spur of Signal Hill on Lovelock Avenue, next to the Botanic Gardens and above Logan Park. One of Dunedin's earliest cemeteries (begun in 1872), many of Dunedin's notable early citizens are buried here, among them William Larnach and Thomas Bracken. Larnach's Gothic mausoleum is the most prominent structure in the cemetery, which commands impressive views across central Dunedin.

Also of note are two university halls of residence that lie close to the southern end of Ōpoho. Knox College is a prominent towered red brick building on the lower slopes. Established as a theological hall in 1907, Knox is still a centre of the University of Otago's religious studies courses. Below this hall, close to the Gardens Corner, lies the smaller Salmond College, built in 1971. Also of note within the suburb is the Dunedin branch of the Society for the Prevention of Cruelty to Animals, which has its headquarters in the suburb, and Tannock Glen, a public gardens which is notable for its rhododendrons. Sports clubs based in the suburb include the Alhambra Union Rugby Club, based at Ōpoho Park near the junction of Ōpoho Road and Lovelock Avenue.

Numerous walking tracks cross the Botanic Gardens, Signal Hill, and the slopes between. These include a track across the summit of Signal Hill to link up with Cleghorn Street above the northern end of North East Valley, and tracks connecting the Centennial Memorial with Logan Park and the harbourside suburb of Ravensbourne.

Noted Ōpoho residents have included artist Arthur Merric Boyd, athlete Jack Lovelock, celebrity chef Alison Holst, opera singer Patricia Payne and former All Black Kees Meeuws.

Demographics

Ōpoho had a population of 1,218 at the 2018 New Zealand census, an increase of 18 people (1.5%) since the 2013 census, and a decrease of 18 people (-1.5%) since the 2006 census. There were 480 households. There were 588 males and 633 females, giving a sex ratio of 0.93 males per female. The median age was 38.5 years (compared with 37.4 years nationally), with 216 people (17.7%) aged under 15 years, 270 (22.2%) aged 15 to 29, 561 (46.1%) aged 30 to 64, and 174 (14.3%) aged 65 or older.

Ethnicities were 89.7% European/Pākehā, 7.9% Māori, 1.7% Pacific peoples, 6.9% Asian, and 2.7% other ethnicities (totals add to more than 100% since people could identify with multiple ethnicities).

The proportion of people born overseas was 24.1%, compared with 27.1% nationally.

Although some people objected to giving their religion, 57.1% had no religion, 31.8% were Christian, 0.5% were Hindu, 0.7% were Muslim, 1.2% were Buddhist and 3.4% had other religions.

Of those at least 15 years old, 561 (56.0%) people had a bachelor or higher degree, and 66 (6.6%) people had no formal qualifications. The median income was $34,400, compared with $31,800 nationally. 240 people (24.0%) earned over $70,000 compared to 17.2% nationally. The employment status of those at least 15 was that 480 (47.9%) people were employed full-time, 177 (17.7%) were part-time, and 48 (4.8%) were unemployed.

Education
Ōpoho School (Te Kura o Ōpoho) is a state contributing primary school serving years 1 to 6 with a roll of  students as of  The school was founded in 1938.

References

Suburbs of Dunedin